The DAF-1 gene encodes for a cell surface Enzyme-linked receptor of TGF-beta signaling pathway in the worm Caenorhabditis elegans.  DAF-1 is one of the type I receptor of TGF-beta pathway. DAF-1 acts as a receptor protein serine/threonine kinase, is activated by type II receptor Daf-4 phosphorylation after the ligand Daf-7 binds to the receptor heterotetramer, and then phosphorylates Daf-8 or Daf-14, the SMAD proteins in C. elegans.

References 

Caenorhabditis elegans genes